The 1932 Albanian National Championship was the third season of the Albanian National Championship, the top professional league for association football clubs.

Overview
It was contested by 5 teams, and KF Tirana won the championship.

League standings

Results

Winning Squad of KF Tirana

Trainer: Selman Stermasi

References
Albania - List of final tables (RSSSF)
Albania Sport, Albanian Superliga dead link

Kategoria Superiore seasons
1
Albania
Albania

sq:Kategoria e Parë 1931